Cnismatocentrum is a genus of brachiopods belonging to the family Cnismatocentridae.

Species:

Cnismatocentrum parvum 
Cnismatocentrum sakalinensis
Cnismatocentrum sakhalinensis

References

Brachiopod genera
Terebratulida